The Hunt is the second album by the American indie band Guv'ner. It was released in 1996 by Merge Records in the United States, and Wiiija Records in the UK. The album was produced by Don Fleming and Julie Cafritz. 

"She's Evil," "The Nazarene," and "Break a Promise" were released as singles. Guv'ner supported the album by touring with Cat Power.

Critical reception
The Washington Post wrote that "Guv'ner favors a ragged, grimy sound ... When bassist Pumpkin Wentzel ... adds her harmonies, Guv'ner goes pop despite its best attempts at edginess and minimalism." The Fort Worth Star-Telegram deemed the album "tuneful, heartfelt—sometimes humorous and goofy—rock." 

The San Diego Union-Tribune praised Wentzel, writing that her "instrumentation and too-infrequent singing make Pixies-era Kim Deal a handy reference point." The State concluded that the band manages "to retain its lo-fi elegance and inspired dilettantish approach."

In 2003, Philadelphia Weekly called the album "an overlooked treasure."

Track listing
 "Motorcycle Man"
 "Stone's Throw"
 "She's Evil"
 "The Nazarene"
 "Your Majesty"
 "Tom Tom"
 "Break a Promise"
 "Feet on Wood"
 "Southern Baptist w/ Sparklers"
 "Leave Me Be"
 "Rockbending"
 "Ghost of Your Controllership"

Instrumentation and Personnel
Charles Gansa (guitar, vocals)
Pumpkin Wentzel (bass, vocals)
Danny Tunick (drums)
Julie Cafritz and Don Fleming (backing vocals on "She's Evil")

References

External links
The Hunt on MergeRecords.com

1996 albums
Merge Records albums